Asép (romanized as Asep in Indonesian Spelling System) is a male Sundanese or Badui given name. It is derived from the Sundanese root word Kasép, meaning handsome. Other forms of this name are Encép, Cécép, and Aép.

Asep as first name was found 1328 times in 17 different countries.

Possible meanings 
The meaning of the name Asep depends on the language used.

 In Sundanese, Asep derived from Kasép, means "handsome".
 In Sanskrit, Asep means "scented incense".
 In Indonesian, Asep means “spiritual, mystical, or belief in spirits”.

There is a relationship or not, the three meanings have the same impression as a condition that has a positive aura. Kasép or handsome gives suggestions and prayers that a person named Asep is expected to have a beautiful face and attitude in his life, meaning that the positive vibes emitted by the fragrant incense gives the impression that he always wants to scent his surroundings.

Notable people with this name 

 Asep Sunandar Sunarya, a Sundanese wayang golék dalang
 Asep Kambali, an Indonesian historian who is concerned with the field of Indonesia History of Colonial Era
 Asep Budi, an Indonesian footballer

See also

References 

Given names
Sundanese masculine given names